A Java compiler is a compiler for the programming language Java.  The most common form of output from a Java compiler is Java class files containing platform-neutral Java bytecode, but there are also compilers that output optimized native machine code for a particular hardware/operating system combination, most notably the now discontinued GNU Compiler for Java.

Most Java-to-bytecode compilers do virtually no optimization, leaving this until run time to be done by the Java virtual machine (JVM).

The JVM loads the class files and either interprets the bytecode or just-in-time compiles it to machine code and then possibly optimizes it using dynamic compilation.

A standard on how to interact with Java compilers programmatically was specified in JSR 199.

See also 
 List of Java Compilers
 javac, the standard Java compiler in Oracle's JDK

References

External links
 Sun's OpenJDK javac page
 Stephan Diehl, "A Formal Introduction to the Compilation of Java", Software - Practice and Experience, Vol. 28(3), pages 297-327, March 1998.

 
Java specification requests